The 2019 Louth Senior Football Championship is the 126th edition of the Louth GAA's premier club Gaelic football tournament for senior graded teams in County Louth, Ireland. The tournament consists of 12 teams, with the winner going on to represent Louth in the Leinster Senior Club Football Championship. The championship starts with a group stage and then progresses to a knock out stage.

Newtown Blues were the defending champions for the second time in a row after they defeated the Naomh Máirtín in the previous years final. They successfully defended their crown to claim a "3-in-a-row" of S.F.C. titles and their 23rd overall when defeating the same opposition by 2-9 to 1-9 at Drogheda Park on 20 October 2019.

This was St. Mochta's return to the senior grade after at 37 year absence (they were relegated from the S.F.C. to the I.F.C. back in 1982) when claiming the 2018 Louth Intermediate Football Championship title with a final victory over St. Fechin's.

Seán O'Mahony's were relegated to the I.F.C. for 2020 after a 5 year spell in the top-flight when losing to the O'Connells in the relegation final. Since winning 2014 I.F.C. the Point Road club reached two senior finals in 2015 and 2016, winning the latter against St. Mary's Ardee.

Team Changes

The following teams have changed division since the 2018 championship season.

To S.F.C.
Promoted from 2018 Louth Intermediate Football Championship
 St. Mochta's  -  (Intermediate Champions)

From S.F.C.
Relegated to 2019 Louth Intermediate Football Championship
 Kilkerley Emmets

Group stage
There are 4 groups called Group A, B, C and D. The top two finishers in each group will qualify for the quarter-finals. The bottom finishers of each group will qualify for the Relegation Play-off.

Group A

Round 1
 St. Mochta's 1-13, 0-10 Dundalk Gaels, Dowdallshill, 14/7/2019,

Round 2
 Newtown Blues 1-15, 0-12 St. Mochta's, Castlebellingham, 21/7/2019,

Round 3
 Newtown Blues 0-17, 0-7 Dundalk Gaels, Dunleer, 28/7/2019,

Group B

Round 1
 St. Mary's Ardee 2-14, 3-10 O'Raghallaighs, Dunleer, 14/7/2019,

Round 2
 St. Mary's Ardee 1-16, 0-14 O'Connells, Dunleer, 21/7/2019,

Round 3
 O'Raghallaighs 3-14, 0-10 O'Connells, Dunleer, 28/7/2019,

Group C

Round 1
 Dreadnots 1-15, 0-14 St. Patrick's Lordship, Castlebellingham, 14/7/2019,

Round 2
 Dreadnots 0-12, 0-12 Seán O'Mahonys, Dowdallshill, 20/7/2019,

Round 3
 St. Patrick's Lordship 0-13, 0-9 Seán O'Mahonys, Dunleer, 27/7/2019,

Group D

Round 1
 Naomh Mairtin 2-12, 1-9 St. Joseph's, Dunleer, 14/7/2019,

Round 2
 Naomh Mairtin 0-12, 1-8 Geraldines, Dunleer, 21/7/2019,

Round 3
 Geraldines 1-12, 0-13 St. Joseph's, Ecco Road, 28/7/2019,

Knock-out stages

Relegation play-off
The four bottom finishers from each group qualify for the relegation play off. The team to lose both matches will be relegated to the 2019 Intermediate Championship.

Finals
The winners and runners up of each group qualify for the quarter finals.

Quarter-finals

Semi-finals

Final
Originally scheduled for 13 October, the Louth S.F.C. final at Drogheda Park was postponed. It's understood the pitch was playable, but in the interest of spectator safety, with the grass bank soaked, the decision to call off the matches was taken. The final was re-fixed for the following Sunday.

Leinster Senior Club Football Championship

References

Louth SFC
Louth Senior Football Championship
Louth Senior Football Championship